LIX (abbreviation of Swedish läsbarhetsindex, "readibility index") is a readability measure indicating the difficulty of reading a text developed by Swedish scholar Carl-Hugo Björnsson. It is computed as follows:

, where

 is the number of words,

 is the number of periods (defined by period, colon or capital first letter), and

 is the number of long words (more than 6 letters). 

Scores usually range from 20 ("very easy") to 60 ("very difficult").

References

Further reading
 Björnsson, C. H. (1968). Läsbarhet. Stockholm: Liber.
 Björnsson, C. H. (1971). Læsbarhed. København: Gad.

External links
 Detailed LIX calculator (in Swedish)

Readability tests